Konrad Krzysztof Szymański (born 6 December 1969) is a Polish politician who was Minister for European Affairs from 2015 to 2022.

Biography
Szymański was growing up in Kalisz. He earned a Master of Law at Adam Mickiewicz University in Poznań in 1995. He was an advisor to the Deputy Marshall of the Sejm from 1999 to 2000, subsequently serving in the Political Cabinet of the Prime Minister of Poland.

From 2004 to 2014, he was a Member of the European Parliament for the Lower Silesian Voivodship & Opole Voivodship with the Law and Justice party, part of the European Conservatives and Reformists group. Szymański sat on the European Parliament's Committee on Foreign Affairs and its Committee on Women's Rights and Gender Equality. He was a substitute on the Committee on Civil Liberties, Justice and Home Affairs and a member of the delegation for relations with Belarus. In 2013 and 2014, Polityka and Rzeczpospolita respectively voted him one of the best Polish members of the European Parliament.

On 9 November 2015, Szymański was appointed the Polish Secretary of State for European Affairs at the Ministry of Foreign Affairs.

He resigned in October 2022.

References

External links
 Official website

1969 births
Adam Mickiewicz University in Poznań alumni
Living people
Government ministers of Poland
Politicians from Kalisz
Law and Justice MEPs
MEPs for Poland 2004–2009
MEPs for Poland 2009–2014